Trithamnora is a genus of moths belonging to the family Tineidae. It contains only one species, Trithamnora certella, which is found in New Zealand.

The wingspan is about 16 mm. The forewings are pinkish grey and white.

References

Tineidae
Monotypic moth genera
Moths of New Zealand
Endemic fauna of New Zealand
Taxa named by Edward Meyrick
Tineidae genera
Endemic moths of New Zealand